Isogona punctipennis is a species of moth of the family Erebidae. It is found in Arizona.

The wingspan is 23–26 mm.

External links
Images
Bug Guide

Boletobiinae